The Ethiopia women's national football team (Amharic: የኢትዮጵያ ሴቶች ብሔራዊ እግር ሷስ ቡድን) represents Ethiopia in international women's football. They are overseen by the Ethiopian Football Federation. As of June 2017, they are ranked 97th in the world. They are popularly known as Lucy and Dinknesh in reference to the Australopithecus fossil.

History

The Ethiopian national team made its debut in September 2002 in the 2002 African Championship's qualifiers, beating Uganda to progress to the final tournament, where it ended last in its group, only grasping a tie with Mali. It subsequently played the 2003 All-Africa Games, losing all three games.

In 2004 they again qualified for the African Championship, where they made it to the semifinals after beating South Africa and drawing with Zimbabwe. After being knocked out by Nigeria, they lost the bronze to Ghana on penalties. As of 2013 it remains Ethiopia's best performance in the competition.

Ethiopia withdrew from the 2006 African Championship, and it didn't take part in the 2008 edition either. However it did take part in the 2007 All-Africa Games, losing its two games. In its return to the African Championship in 2010 it was defeated in the qualifiers by Tanzania. On the other hand, in the 2012 Summer Olympics qualifiers Ethiopia made it to the final round after knocking out Congo DR and Ghana, ultimately losing a spot in the Olympics to South Africa.

In 2012 the team qualified for the African Championship 8 years later, settling the score with Tanzania. It didn't manage to score, only grasping a draw with Cameroon.

Team image

Nicknames
The Ethiopia women's national football team has been known or nicknamed as "Lucy".

Overall competitive record

Results and fixtures

The following is a list of match results in the last 12 months, as well as any future matches that have been scheduled.

Legend

2022

2023

Coaching staff

Current coaching staff

As of October 2021

Manager history

Abrham Haimanot
Meseret Manne (2016–2017)
 Selam Zeray (????–2021)
Birhanu Gizaw (2021–2022)
Frew Hailegbrael( 2022–present)

Players

Current squad
This is the Final Squad named on May 2022 For 2022 CECAFA Women's Championship  .
 Caps and goals accurate up to and including 30 October 2021.

Recent call-ups
The following players have been called up to an Ethiopia squad in the past 12 months.

Previous squads
Africa Women Cup of Nations
2012 African Women's Championship squad
CECAFA Women's Championship
2022 CECAFA Women's Championship squads

Records

 Active players in bold, statistics correct as of 2020.

Most capped players

Top goalscorers

Competitive record

FIFA Women's World Cup

*Draws include knockout matches decided on penalty kicks.

Olympic Games

*Draws include knockout matches decided on penalty kicks.

Africa Women Cup of Nations

African Games

CECAFA Women's Championship

Honours

Regional
CECAFA Women's Championship

See also

Sport in Ethiopia
Football in Ethiopia
Women's football in Ethiopia
Ethiopia women's national under-20 football team
Ethiopia women's national under-17 football team
Ethiopia men's national football team

References

External links
Official website 
FIFA profile 
National women's football team picture

 
African women's national association football teams